Dušan Popović (born 20 April 1981) is a Serbian footballer.

He was on loan to Admira Wacker Mödling of Austrian Bundesliga in January 2004, from Second League of Serbia and Montenegro side FK Timok. In summer 2004, he moved to play in the Ukrainian Premier League with Volyn Lutsk. In 2008, he played in the Premier League of Bosnia and Herzegovina with FK Modriča. Throughout his tenure with Modrica he played in the 2008–09 UEFA Champions League against Aalborg BK. He played in the Albanian Superliga in 2010 with KF Bylis, and later with FK Apolonia Fier in 2012. In 2015, he played in the Canadian Soccer League with Milton SC.

References

External links
 

1981 births
Living people
People from Negotin
Serbian footballers
Association football forwards
FK Timok players
Serbian expatriate footballers
Expatriate footballers in Austria
FC Admira Wacker Mödling players
Serbian expatriate sportspeople in Austria
Expatriate footballers in Ukraine
FC Volyn Lutsk players
Ukrainian Premier League players
KF Bylis Ballsh players
KF Apolonia Fier players
Kategoria Superiore players
Milton SC players
Canadian Soccer League (1998–present) players
FK Modriča players
Premier League of Bosnia and Herzegovina players